Barbe may refer to:

Places
 Île Barbe on the Saône, in Lyon, France
 Barbe Airport, Mopti, Mali

People
 Barbe, a surname

Other uses
 Barbe-class utility landing craft of the German Navy
 Alfred M. Barbe High School, Lake Charles, Louisiana, USA

See also
 Barb wire (disambiguation)
 Barbes (disambiguation)
 Barbey (disambiguation)
 Barbee (disambiguation)
 Barbie (disambiguation)
 Barbi (disambiguation)
 Barby (disambiguation)
 Barb (disambiguation)
 Sainte-Barbe (disambiguation)